Desolate is the second studio album by Alien Faktor, released in 1995 by Decibel.

Reception
A critic for Sonic Boom praised Desolate appreciated the musical diversity of the album and said "each track depicts a single discrete scene but listened to as a whole the listener can begin to appreciate the full effect of the experience."

Track listing

Personnel
Adapted from the Desolate liner notes.

Alien Faktor
 Tom Muschitz – vocals, programming, production, engineering, recording, mixing, mastering

Additional musicians
 Peter Balestrieri – saxophone (3)
 Lars Hansen – vocals and programming (5),
 Leif Hansen – programming (5)
 Mike Hunsberger – guitar (6, 7), sampler (2)
 Dan Kucza – guitar (1)
 Karl J. Paloucek – fretless bass (1)
 Terry Reed (as Warlock) – vocals and arrangements (3)
 Bill Stace – drums (7)

Production and design
 Daniel Streng – cover art, design

Release history

References

External links 
 Desolate at Discogs (list of releases)

1995 albums
Alien Faktor albums
Decibel (record label) albums